Daniel Kretschmer (born 19 September 1971), better known by his stage-name D-Flame, is a German hip hop and reggae musician. He was also previously part of the hip hop formation Asiatic Warriors.

Discography

Albums
 2000 - Basstard
 2002 - Daniel X – eine schwarze deutsche Geschichte ("Daniel X – A Black German Story")
 2003 - Unaufhaltsam ("Unstoppable")
 2006 - F.F.M. (Flame F.M.)
 2008 - ...Stress

Singles
 1999 - "Heisser" ("Hotter")
 2000 - "Sorry" (feat. Eißfeldt)
 2001 - "Sie macht mich glücklich" ("She makes me happy")
 2002 - "Mehr als Musik" ("More than just music" feat. Tone)
 2002 - "Heimatlos" ("Homeless")
 2002 - "Stopp"
 2003 - "Kopf hoch" ("Chin up")
 2003 - "Du kennst mich nicht" ("You don't know me")
 2006 - "Burnin' Nonstop" (feat. Wayne Marshall)
 2007 - "Mom Song"

See also
 German hip hop
 List of reggae musicians

References

Living people
German rappers
German people of Jamaican descent
Participants in the Bundesvision Song Contest
German reggae musicians
Mercury Records artists
EMI Records artists
1971 births